DOSTv: Science for the People is a daily weather, science and technology television and online program in the Philippines produced by the Department of Science and Technology – Science and Technology Information Institute (DOST – STII). DOSTv is currently aired on free television via state-owned People's Television Network Channel 4 from Monday to Friday at 9:30 a.m. (UTC +08) and soon on cable and satellite TV thru Global News Network (GNN) at 11:00 a.m. and 4:00 p.m. (UTC +08) and other local channels.

The program can be also viewed online every day at 9:30 a.m. (UTC +08) on the show's official website, Facebook page and YouTube account.

History
Hosted by Net 25 personality Gel Miranda, the program made a soft-launching on May 30, 2016, and it was first aired online. It was once known as "The Filipino Weather Channel" during the first few months of the program. On February 27, 2017, DOSTv was officially launched, coinciding with the 30th Anniversary of the DOST – STII. The programs also made a rebrand into "DOSTV: Science for the People", with new graphics, broadcast design and additional segments.

On May 29, 2017, in time for its first anniversary, DOSTv transitioned from being an online-only weather and SciTech channel to a television program aired on PTV-4. It is the third weather program of the station, following PAGASA I-Weather (2012) and Panahon.TV (2012–2016, later transferred to Pilipinas HD) excluding PTV InfoWeather segment of PTV News.

Segments
Some of the segments of the show are the following: weather, flood, dam, seismology and volcanology updates from PAGASA and PHILVOLCS, interviews with DOST officials and SciTech experts, exclusive coverages of DOST events, and other featured segments such as Balitang RapiDOST (DOST news updates); Sinesiyensya (SciTech documentaries); Global Science (SciTech world news); Sci-Facts (trivia) and Sustansyarap (DOST-FNRI cooking portion).

See also
Panahon.TV

References

2017 Philippine television series debuts
People's Television Network original programming
Philippine television shows